Kambras, formerly CETA, is a music and dance-theatre company based at Buenos Aires, Argentina. Formerly known as CETA, it was established in 2005, and renamed in 2011 for the presentation of their first short film Pixilation II

Kambras is an independent collective of Argentine Tango dancers, musicians, technicians and media artists. It is led by Gonzalo Orihuela, Julián Rodriguez Orihuela and Solange Chapperon. Their intent has been to have a more different, cosmopolitan and contemporary approach to tango dance than other existing tango dance companies.
In particular, the company has been known to continuously bring new and refreshing ideas in to the standstill tango performance scene.

Director
Gonzalo Orihuela is a South African born Argentine blogger, teacher and choreographer of Argentine tango. Born in 1980. He is regarded as part of the vanguard of scenic tango, and he is best known for his pieces created with the group.

Performers
Diego Mauriño guest actor
Julian Hahn Musician 
Julian Rodriguez Orihuela actor and musician
Juan Fosatti dancer and musician
Mayumi Urgino musician
Natalia Fures dancer and musician
Pablo Rodriguez dancer and musician 
Solange Chapperon dancer
Claudio Del Bianco Light design
Anibal Tonianez sound technician and musician

It has thus far produced 4 dance pieces, two of which have toured internationally, and 1 animation film. Their performances have the goal of breaking down the barriers between dance, theatre, and music.

Current repertoire
El Sonido de las Caricias
Cram

Other theatrical creations
1905 Tango (2011) Created under request to be performed in La Bombonera
Resurección

Films, clips and spots
Pixilation II
Banquito
Menage a Trois
Pixilation

Notes and references
"Tangauta interview" (April - 2013) 
"Balletin Dance" (March 2013)
"Tangodanza - German" (2010)
"Argentine Tango - Dance Research Centre" (2008)
"Buenos Aires Heralds"(2008)
"Alternativa Teatral"
"Interview in KadmusArts"

External links
Kambras.com
Gonga's Blog

Tango
Theatre in Argentina
Dance companies